The R619 is a Regional Route in South Africa.

Route
Its northern terminus is the N2, north-east of Empangeni and north of Richards Bay. It heads south, for nine kilometers to meet the R34 at Richards Bay.

References

Regional Routes in KwaZulu-Natal